Cephalops spurius is a species of fly in the family Pipunculidae. It is found in the Palearctic.

References

External links
Images representing  Chalurus spurius at BOLD

Pipunculidae
Insects described in 1816
Diptera of Europe
Taxa named by Francis Walker (entomologist)